Railway stations in Nigeria include:

Maps 

 UN Map
 UNHCR Atlas Map

Cities served by rail 
The East (E) and West (W) lines are connected by the Link Line.

West Line 
 Apapa (W) - Lagos. Port ; flour mill ; oil terminals 
 Lagos (W) (0 km) - Terminus station
 Yaba (W) - Lagos suburban railway
 Oshodi (W) - Lagos suburban railway
 Ikeja (W) - Lagos suburban railway
 Agege (W) - Lagos suburban railway
 Agbado (W) - Lagos suburban railway
 Ijoko (W) - terminus of suburban trains, 2013 
 Abeokuta (W)

 Agege (W) - junction 
 Ibadan (W) (156 km)
 Oshogbo (W)
 Ilorin (W)
 Zungeru (W) - bridge
 Minna (W) - junction for Baro
 Kaduna (W) - junction for East Line; junction for Abuja
 Zaria (WX) - junction for Kaura Namoda (W)
  Kano (W) (1124 km) (capital Kano state)
  Nguru (W) - terminus near Niger border

  Zaria (W) - junction
  Funtua (W)
  Gusau (WN)
  Kaura Namoda (W)
   Nigeria-Niger border
  Niamey

 Bajoga 
 Enugu 
 Idogo (W) - branch terminus

 Minna (W) - junction for Baro (capital Niger state)
 Baro (W) (branch terminus) on River Niger

 Ikeja

 (Standard gauge) 
 Kaduna (W) junction for Abuja (0 km) completed 2014, but not enough rolling stock  (plan B)
 Abuja (W) - national capital - 2016 (186 km)  In August 2016, the new standard gauge line between Kaduna and Abuja was complete.

Coast Line 
 proposed standard gauge
 Lagos
 Benin City (capital Edo state) (300 km)
 Port Harcourt (capital Rivers state)

Link Line 

 Kaduna (W) - junction for East Line cross country
 Idon (WE)
 Kafanchan (E) - junction to West Line cross country

Central Line 1435mm 

This line is isolated from the East and West lines.
 Agbaja (C) - Iron ore
 (proposed 2011)

 Itakpe (C) - iron ore
 Ajaokuta (C)
 Ovu (49m) (C)
 (incomplete 22 km)
 Warri (C) - A line to Warri was planned; contractor paid October 2009; completion unknown.

 (gauge convertible sleepers)
 Port Harcourt
 Onne

East Line 
 Port Harcourt (E)
 Aba (E)
 Enugu (E)
 Otukpo (E)
 Igumale (E)
 Makurdi (E) - major bridge
 Kafanchan (E) - junction to West Line
 Kuru (E) - junction for Jos
 Bukuru (E) - tin
 Jos (E) - tin
 (built 1961) 
 Gombe (E),
 Maiduguri (E) (terminus) - nearest railhead to Chad

 Lafia (E)
 Oshogbo (W)
 Umagha (E)
 Uyo (E)
 Umuahia (E)
 Chamo (E)
 Yenagoa (E) - the Bayelsa state capital since c1996

Rehabilitate 

 Lagos (W)
 488 km
 Jebba (W) - on River Niger

Under Construction 
 (standard gauge) 
 (double track)
 Lagos (0 km)
 Kano (128 km)
 Ibadan (W) (156 km)

Proposed 
 (standard gauge)
  Lagos
  Abeokuta (W) 
  Ibadan

 Ibadan
 Oshogbo(W) 
 Ilorin

 Nyanya
 Minna (W)

 (Coast Line)
 Lagos 0 km
 Benin City
 Calabar - 1402 km - near border with Cameroon

Feasibility studies 
 (2014)
 Lagos-Abuja (615 km);
 Ajaokuta-Obajana-Jakura-Boro-Abuja with an additional line from Otukpo;
 Anyinga-Ejule-Ida-Adoru-Nsuuka-Adani-Omor-Anaku-Aguleri-Nsugbe-Onitcha;
 Zaria-Kaura Namoda-Nnewi-Owerri-Illela-Birni to Konni in the Niger Republic (520 km);
 Benin City-Agbor-Onicha-Nnewi-Owerri-Aba
 Onitcha-Enugu-Abakaliki;
 Eganyi-Lokoja-Abaji-Abuja (280 km). *

To Niger 

  Kauran Namoda (0 km) railhead
  Sokoto
  Birnin Kebbi 
   (about 250 km) - border
  Birnin-N'konni
  Niamey
--
  Kano (SGR) 
   - border
  Maradi

Nigerian Southern 
  Lagos
  Niger River Delta
  Port Harcourt
 Calabar
 (near Cameroon border)

2010 
 Port Harcourt and branches 
 Maiduguri
 Bonny, Nigeria
 Owerri
 Kafanchan
 Gombe, Gombe
 Damaturu
 Gashua

Metro and Light Rail 

Metro lines are proposed for the MegaCity of Lagos.

The first phase of Abuja Light Rail opened in July 2018.

Closed 
 Bauchi Light Railway 
 (open 1914-1927)
 Zaria
 Rahama 

 (regauged about 1927 when  eastern main line reached Kuru)
 Jos - tin mines
 Bukuru - tin mines
 Kuru - future junction
 Bauchi

See also 
  Transport in Nigeria
  Rail transport in Nigeria
  Lagos Terminus
  Nigerian Railway Corporation
  Lagos–Kano Standard Gauge Railway

References 

 
Stations
Lists of buildings and structures in Nigeria
Nigeria